Malpezzi is an Italian surname. Notable people with the surname include:

 Donna Malpezzi, American lawyer
 Simona Malpezzi (born 1972), Italian politician

See also
 Malvezzi

Surnames of Italian origin
Italian-language surnames